The Revolt at Cincinnati, also known as the Cincinnati Coup and the Cincinnati Revolution, was a change in the National Rifle Association of America's (NRA) leadership and organizational policy that took place at the group's 1977 annual convention in Cincinnati, Ohio. Led by former NRA President Harlon Carter and Neal Knox, the movement ended the tenure of Maxwell Rich as NRA executive vice president and introduced new organizational bylaws. The Revolt at Cincinnati has been cited as a turning point in the NRA's history, marking a move away from "hunting, conservation, and marksmanship" and toward the defense of the right to bear arms.

Background
Until the early 1970s, the NRA was focused on marksmanship, environmental stewardship, and recreational events, with limited resources allocated to political lobbying. Following the passage of the 1968 Gun Control Act and the NRA's abstention from the Citizens Against Tydings campaign to unseat Joseph Tydings, a group led by Harlon Carter began advocating for a focus on the defense of gun ownership. Along with Neal Knox, editor of Rifle Magazine, Carter concentrated on winning the support of the NRA's Life Members ahead of the 1977 annual meeting. This membership class, consisting of over 2 million individuals, had voted along with existing leaders in the preceding annual conventions.

The revolt
At the Cincinnati convention, Carter and Knox led a grassroots movement with a focus on preventing the construction of an Outdoor Center in Colorado Springs and unseating the "Old Guard" leadership. The Outdoor Center would have served as new headquarters for the organization, while the Old Guard referred to the many leaders who had spent multiple decades in their positions. Members of the group wore orange hats and carried walkie-talkies on the floor of the convention. Carter's group succeeded in unseating members of the incumbent leadership, producing a subsequent removal of leadership members and a change in organizational focus.

Resulting leadership changes
Carter replaced Rich as executive vice president. The executive vice president position was changed to become a member-elected office. Knox was elected as head of the group's Institute for Legislative Action (NRA-ILA), with the position of vice president for finance, held by Thomas Billings, eliminated; the management committee of the organization, consisting of Merrill Right, Irvine Reynolds, and Alonzo Garcelon, was also eliminated.

Resulting organizational changes
Preceding the 1977 convention, the NRA's leadership had made plans to move the group's headquarters from Washington, D.C., to an Outdoor Center in Colorado Springs focused on conservation and recreational shooting. The new facility had an estimated cost of $30 million. The proposal for this Center was included as an item for discussion in the 1977 meeting, and was rejected following the change in leadership.

The new leadership increased funding for its lobbying arm, the Institute for Legislative Action (NRA-ILA) by an undisclosed amount. The NRA-ILA was given freedom to support the rights to "keep and bear arms". The NRA redefined its stance on gun control, defending protections provided by the Second Amendment. Moving away from prior support for "incremental forms of gun control regulation," new leadership made the "protection of gun rights the NRA's primary cause."

References 

Gun control advocacy groups in the United States
May 1977 events in the United States